M&M's Adventure is an action-adventure video game released on the Nintendo DS and Wii video game consoles by Zoo Games and developed by Nikitova Games.

Gameplay
In the beginning only Red is playable but as the game progresses, one can play as Yellow who has the power to double jump, and Green who can attack with a racket. In the lobby, there are parts blocked by doors with the face of a character which requires the use of that character (depending on the color and image of the door M&M only that M&M can enter). The game has 1 boss of the world and the final is a snowman.

The Factory works as a Lobby in which the player can access the different levels all based on different festivities, which are: Valentine's Day, Easter, Fourth of July, Halloween, and Christmas being the final scenery and the central festivity in the story

Plot
The game takes place around Christmas, With Green, Yellow, and Red in the factory of M&MS. When there is a system error, the harvested candies are ejected and all robots go AWOL, so the heroes embark on the factory to stop the system error and save the factory.

References

Wii games
Nintendo DS games
M&M's
2007 video games
Single-player video games